The men's hammer throw event at the 2009 European Athletics U23 Championships was held in Kaunas, Lithuania, at S. Dariaus ir S. Girėno stadionas (Darius and Girėnas Stadium) on 18 and 19 July.

Medalists

Results

Final
19 July

Qualifications
18 July
Qualifying 69.50 or 12 best to the Final

Group A

Group B

Participation
According to an unofficial count, 25 athletes from 15 countries participated in the event.

 (2)
 (2)
 (1)
 (1)
 (2)
 (2)
 (2)
 (1)
 (2)
 (2)
 (2)
 (1)
 (1)
 (1)
 (3)

References

Hammer throw
Hammer throw at the European Athletics U23 Championships